Balyş Öwezowiç Öwezow (29 December 1915 – 13 October 1975) was Soviet politician who served as the first secretary of the Communist Party of the Turkmen SSR, twice, from 1950 to 1951 and again from 1960 to 1969.

Biography
Öwezow was born in a village in Transcaspian Oblast, today's Turkmenistan, then part of the Russian Empire. Orphaned at an early age, he graduated from the Higher Party School of the Central Committee.

He first worked as a teacher, and took on responsibility for the Komsomol in Turkmenistan. Gradually, he took on greater roles within the Communist Party, before being appointed First Secretary of the Turkmen Communist Party.

He succeeded Şaja Batyrow as First Secretary of the Communist Party of Turkmenistan, beginning his first term in 1950 and staying in office until October 1951, when Suhan Babaýew became First Secretary. During this time, he received the Order of Lenin.

Öwezow was returned to power on 13 June 1960, following the death of Jumadurdy Garaýew. He served until 24 December 1969. Muhammetnazar Gapurow succeeded him.

He fathered six children.

Notes

References

External links 
Turkmenia: Man Masters the Desert  by Balyş Öwezow
 Rulers of Soviet Republics

1915 births
1975 deaths
People from Daşoguz Region
First secretaries of the Communist Party of Turkmenistan
Recipients of the Order of Lenin
Fourth convocation members of the Supreme Soviet of the Soviet Union
Fifth convocation members of the Supreme Soviet of the Soviet Union
Sixth convocation members of the Supreme Soviet of the Soviet Union
Seventh convocation members of the Supreme Soviet of the Soviet Union
Central Committee of the Communist Party of the Soviet Union members
Heads of government of the Turkmen Soviet Socialist Republic